Spanish Immigration to Venezuela began around 1500, when the Spanish first landed on the territory, and continues to the present day. There are many Venezuelans of Spanish origin, especially from the Canary Islands (known as Isleños). And by this event, Most Venezuelans has Spanish Ancestry, even Afro-Venezuelans.

Spanish immigration to Venezuela begins with the Spanish colonization of the Americas and it continued during Colonial Venezuela and after independence (1830). Further immigration has taken place since, particularly following World War II.

History
From the beginning of the colonial period and until the end of the Second World War, most European immigrants in Venezuela were Spanish, predominantly Canary Islanders. Their cultural impact was significant, influencing both the development of Castilian Spanish in the country as well as its cuisine and customs. Venezuela has perhaps the largest population of Canarian origin, and it is commonly said in the Canary Islands that "Venezuela is the eighth island of the Canary Islands." In the 16th century, the German conquistador Georg von Speyer in the Canary Islands recruited 200 men to colonize Venezuela, as did Diego Hernández de Serpa, governor of New Andalusia Province, who sent another 200 soldiers and 400 slaves from Gran Canaria to Venezuela, where some of these Canarians were among the founders of Cumaná.

Since 1936, most Canarian immigrants have gone either to Cuba or to Venezuela (some of those who emigrated to Venezuela came from Cuba) due to encouraged immigration by the government, especially Spanish citizens, and since 1948, most have emigrated to Venezuela. Large-scale immigration did not end until the early 1980s with a significant decrease in the 1970s, and the beginning of Canarian emigration to other European countries. Canary Islanders and their descendants are now scattered throughout Venezuela.

Demographics
In addition, as of 2010, there were around 200,000 Venezuelans residing in Spain. As of December 2014, there are more 231,833 Spanish citizens in Venezuela. Most Venezuelans in Spain have Spanish nationality.

See also
 Isleño#Venezuela
 Venezuelan Spanish
 Spain–Venezuela relations

References

 

European Venezuelan
Demographics of Venezuela
Canarian diaspora
 
Venezuela
Venezuelan people of Spanish descent